Ron (Run; also known as Challa, Chala) is an Afro-Asiatic language cluster spoken in Plateau State, Nigeria. Dialects include Bokkos, Daffo-Mbar-Butura (incl. Mangar), Monguna (Shagawu, 20,000 speakers). Blench (2006) considers these to be separate languages.

Varieties
Blench (2019) lists these language varieties in the Ron (Run) cluster:

Bokkos
Mbar
Daffo–Butura
Manguna
Mangar
Sha

Daffo-Mbar-Butura is spoken in Hottom, Maiduna, Hurum, Fanga, Kandik, Faram, Mandung, Mayi, and Josho villages.

Curiosity
Although modern Ron uses a decimal system, it is well attested that in the past a duodecimal counting system was used.

Notes

References
 Uwe Seibert. 1998. Das ron von Daffo (Jos-Plateau, zentralnigeria):  Morphologische, syntaktische und textlinguistische strukturen einer westtschadischen sprache. European University Series, Asian and African Studies 27. Berlin: Peter Lang.

External links
Roger Blench, Ron Comparative Wordlist
Roger Blench, Dictionary of Lis ma Run (Ron of Bokkos)

West Chadic languages
Languages of Nigeria